Noah Rubin was the defending champion but lost in the final to Mikael Ymer.

Ymer won the title after defeating Rubin 6–3, 6–3 in the final.

Seeds
All seeds receive a bye into the second round.

Draw

Finals

Top half

Section 1

Section 2

Bottom half

Section 3

Section 4

References
Main draw
Qualifying draw

2019 ATP Challenger Tour
2019 Singles